Sonja Licht (born 1947 in Subotica, Serbia, FPR Yugoslavia) is a Serbian sociologist and political activist. Currently, she is president of the Foreign Policy Council at the Serbian Ministry of Foreign Affairs.

Born to Jewish parents Antun and Susana Licht, she obtained a diploma in sociology at the University of Belgrade Faculty of Philosophy. She is currently president of Beogradski fond za političku izuzetnost (Belgrade Fund for Political Excellence). The aim of this non-governmental organization is to educate young Serbian politicians, MPs and party leaders, in order to facilitate the transition toward democracy and EU membership. Sonja Licht is the founder and President of BFPE.

Previously, for more than a decade (1991–2003), she was the president of another non-governmental organization — Fond za Otvoreno Društvo (Open Society Fund), a Serbian branch of George Soros funded Open Society Institute. Editors of the Vreme magazin elected Licht as Person of the Year in 2007.

From 2008 to 2012 she was a member of Politika AD's managing board. She has been awarded several high prizes for her public work.

Honors and awards
  Legion of Honour, Knight (France).
  Order of the Star of Italian Solidarity, Knight (Italy).
  Bundesverdienstkreuz, Member (Germany)

References

External links 
 Short biography of Sonja Licht on the web site of The National Convention on EU
 Interview with Sonja Licht published in Vreme magazin
 Belgrade Fund for Political Excellence

1947 births
Living people
Serbian Jews
People from Subotica
Serbian sociologists
University of Belgrade Faculty of Philosophy alumni
Recipients of the Legion of Honour
Recipients of the Cross of the Order of Merit of the Federal Republic of Germany